The violaceous coucal or violet coucal (Centropus violaceus) is a cuckoo species in the family Cuculidae. It is endemic to the Bismarck Archipelago (Papua New Guinea). Its natural habitat is subtropical or tropical moist lowland forests.

Due to a large range and a population that is not decreasing at a sufficient rate for immediate concern, it is classified as Least concern.

References

violaceous coucal
Birds of the Bismarck Archipelago
violaceous coucal
Taxonomy articles created by Polbot
Taxa named by Jean René Constant Quoy
Taxa named by Joseph Paul Gaimard